Route 165, or Highway 165, may refer to:

Canada
  New Brunswick Route 165
  Prince Edward Island Route 165
  Quebec Route 165
  Saskatchewan Highway 165
  Winnipeg Route 165

Costa Rica
 National Route 165

India
 National Highway 165 (India)

Japan
 Japan National Route 165

United States
 Interstate 165 (disambiguation)
 U.S. Route 165
 Alabama State Route 165
 California State Route 165
 Colorado State Highway 165
 Connecticut Route 165
 Florida State Road 165 (former)
 Georgia State Route 165
 Illinois Route 165
 Indiana State Road 165
 Iowa Highway 165
 Kentucky Route 165
 Maryland Route 165
 M-165 (Michigan highway)
 Minnesota State Highway 165 (former)
 Missouri Route 165
 Nevada State Route 165
 New Jersey Route 165
 New Mexico State Road 165
 New York State Route 165
 Ohio State Route 165
 Oklahoma State Highway 165
 Rhode Island Route 165
 South Carolina Highway 165
 Tennessee State Route 165
 Texas State Highway 165
 Texas State Highway Spur 165
 Ranch to Market Road 165
 Utah State Route 165
 Virginia State Route 165
 Washington State Route 165
 Wisconsin Highway 165

Territories:

 Puerto Rico Highway 165
 Puerto Rico Highway 165R